Eric Rosenthal, (10 July 1905 – 1983) was a South African historian and writer. He was born in Newlands, Cape Town, Cape Colony. He studied as an attorney, later becoming a journalist and writer of many corporate histories. He was a member of the Three Wise Men on Springbok Radio's long-running quiz show, Test the Team.

The elder of two children born to Richard Rosenthal and Hedwig De Beer, he received his first education at Parktown Preparatory School in Johannesburg, and later St. John's College. He chose to follow a legal career and qualified as an attorney at the University of the Witwatersrand. Early opportunities as a journalist saw his virtual abandoning of law. He was competent at sketching and enlivened his books with explanatory drawings.

Rosenthal was married to Jenny Bradley on 18 December 1934 in Westcliff, Johannesburg. They spent most of their married life in Fish Hoek near Cape Town.

Rosenthal has been attributed with helping write the initial batch of Chappies "Did You Know?" facts.

Bibliography

Memories & Sketches
From Drury Lane to Mecca
Old Time Survivals in South Africa
Stars and Stripes in Africa
The Fall of Italian East Africa
Fortress on Sand
General Dan Pienaar
Japan's Bid for Africa
General de Wet
Gold Bricks and Mortar
African Switzerland
The South African Saturday Book
Homes of the Golden City
They Walk in the Night
Pinelands
South African Jews in World War II
Shovel and Sieve
Here are Diamonds
The Hinges Creaked
Shelter from the Spray
Shells to Shillings
Other Men's Millions
Cutlass and Yardarm
Today's News Today
The Changing Years
River of Diamonds
Overdrafts and Overwork
Apology Refused
Heinrich Egersdörfer:an Old-Time Sketch Book
Tankards and Tradition

Schooners and Skyscrapers
South African Surnames

History of Fish Hoek 1818-1968
Gold! Gold! Gold!
Meet Me at the Carlton
You Have Been Listening
The Rand Rush
Victorian South Africa

The Best of Eric Rosenthal
Fish Horns and Hansom Cabs
Rustenburg Romance
160 Years of Cape Town Printing
On Change Through the Years
50 Years of the Cape Town Orchestra
50 Years of Healing
300 Years of the Castle at Cape Town
The Story of The Cape Jewish Orphanage published in 1961

Family
Eric Rosenthal's grandfather was Albert Rosenthal, who settled in Middelburg in the Eastern Cape in about 1854, where he was on the board of directors of the Standard Bank of South Africa. He married Pauline Emmanuel from Germany, who was a fellow music student with Engelbert Humperdinck. They produced three sons – two elder sons born in Germany, Julius (1868–1902) and Richard born 1869, and lastly Berthold born 1885 in Middelburg.

References

External links

1905 births
1983 deaths
20th-century South African historians
Alumni of St John's College (Johannesburg)
Historians of South Africa
University of the Witwatersrand alumni
Writers from Cape Town